David Bogie (born 31 July 1987) is a British rally driver from Dumfries. He has held the title of Scottish Rally Champion for a record breaking six years from 2009 until 2013 and 2022. At the end of season 2011, he was both Scottish and British Rally Champion, the first person ever to hold both titles simultaneously.

Career
His first rally was in 2004 at the wheel of a Vauxhall Nova on a round of the SRC. He continued to use this car throughout 2005 and 2006 in the BTRDA Rally Championship in the 1400 section. In 2007, he had his first stage win, driving a Toyota Corolla WRC. That year he came third in the SRC, a feat he repeated in 2008.

2009 saw him mount a full season in the British Rally Championship where, despite two podium finishes, reliability problems with his Mitsubishi EVO X meant he had a disappointing season. Bogie and long term co-driver, Kevin Rae from Hawick, took the SRC crown in 2009, at age 22, becoming the youngest winner of the SRC since Colin McRae in 1988.

During the 2010 SRC season, he drove his Mitsubishi Lancer Evo 9 (with a one-off outing in a Ford Focus WRC) where he took maximum points in six of the eight rounds of the championship.

August 2011 saw Bogie clinch the Scottish Rally Championship for the third successive year with 2 rounds remaining. Winning four of the six rounds so far, again in his Mitsubishi (with a one-off outing in his fathers Metro 6R4), he was uncatchable on points by this stage in the competition.

On 24 September 2011, David Bogie finished 3rd in the Yorkshire rally. This result ensured he had enough points to be crowned British Rally Champion for the first time. He is the first Scot to win both the Scottish and British Rally Championships in the same year.

In September 2012, following the Merrick Forest Stages Rally he and his co-driver Kevin Rae were declared Scottish Rally Champions for the fourth year in succession.

SRC season 2013 saw Bogie retire his Mitsubishi EVO and take to the stages in an ex-Colin McRae Ford Focus WRC 02.

For 2016 and 2017 Bogie and Rae entered the British Rally Championship. They competed in a Škoda Fabia R5 run by Carlisle, Cumbria based CA1 Sport. A lack of consistency meant they could only manage 7th overall in 2016 and 8th in 2017.

Complete World Rally Championship results

WRC 2 results

IRC results

ERC results

References

External links
davidbogie.co.uk – Official website
David Bogie – EWRC profile page

Scottish Rally Championship
Living people
Scottish rally drivers
Sportspeople from Dumfries
1987 births
European Rally Championship drivers
Intercontinental Rally Challenge drivers